Simone Lang (born 30 April 1971) is a German former figure skater. She is the 1989 Skate Canada International silver medalist, 1989 Skate America bronze medalist, and 1992 Nebelhorn Trophy champion. Lang achieved her highest ISU Championship placement, fourth, at the 1989 and 1992 European Championships. On the national level, she won three medals at the German Championships and one at the East German Championships.

Lang was coached by Jutta Müller in Chemnitz and later by Peter Jonas in Oberstdorf and Düsseldorf.

Competitive highlights

References 

1971 births
German female single skaters
Living people
Sportspeople from Chemnitz